Bhuvanaikabahu III (a.k.a. Vanni Buvaneka Bahu) was King of Dambadeniya in the 14th century, who reigned in the year 1325/6. He succeeded Parakkamabahu IV as King of Dambadeniya and was succeeded by Vijayabahu V.                

According to local folklore, he was also responsible for the construction of the Kurunegala Lake.
 List of Sri Lankan monarchs
 History of Sri Lanka

References

External links
 Kings & Rulers of Sri Lanka
 Codrington's Short History of Ceylon

Monarchs of Dambadeniya
House of Siri Sanga Bo
B
B